Kristina Mladenovic was the defending champion, but she did not compete in the juniors this year.

Elina Svitolina won the tournament, defeating Ons Jabeur in the final, 6–2, 7–5.

Seeds

Draw

Finals

Top half

Section 1

Section 2

Bottom half

Section 3

Section 4

References 
 Main draw

Girls' Singles
French Open, 2010 Girls' Singles